Germán José Chavarría Jiménez  (born 19 March 1959 in San José) is a retired Costa Rican football player who currently is an assistant coach for Herediano.

Club career
Chavarría made his professional debut for Herediano on 12 November 1978 against Saprissa and scored his first goal on 7 June 1981 against Puntarenas. He would play his entire career for Herediano from 1978 to 1995, making him the club record-holder with most games when he played 492 consecutive Costa Rican Primera División matches without being expelled.

He retired after a testimonial match on 6 December 1995.

International career
The moustached defensive midfielder made his debut for Costa Rica in a March 1983 friendly match against Mexico and collected 46 caps, scoring 1 goal. He was part of the Tico's squad that played in the 1990 FIFA World Cup held in Italy, and featured in all four games played. He also played at the 1984 Summer Olympics in Los Angeles. 

He played his final international on December 17, 1994 against Saudi Arabia.

International goals
Scores and results list Costa Rica's goal tally first.

Managerial career
In May 2014, Chavarría was appointed assistant to Herediano manager César Méndez.

Personal life
He is married to Angela Chaves and they have two children.

References

External links

1959 births
Living people
People from Tibás
Association football midfielders
Costa Rican footballers
Costa Rica international footballers
1990 FIFA World Cup players
Olympic footballers of Costa Rica
Footballers at the 1984 Summer Olympics
C.S. Herediano footballers
Costa Rican football managers